"I'm Gonna Love You Through It" is a song written by Ben Hayslip, Sonya Isaacs and Jimmy Yeary and recorded by American country music artist Martina McBride. It was released in July 2011 as the second single from her album Eleven. On November 30, 2011, the song received a nomination at the 54th Grammy Awards for Best Country Solo Performance. To date, this is McBride’s final Top 10 hit.

Content
The song is about a 38-year-old woman who is supported by her husband while battling breast cancer. The subject of the song survives. Co-writer Sonya Isaacs' inspiration for the song was her mother, Lily, who is a breast cancer survivor. It is in F major with an approximate tempo of 70 beats per minute, a vocal range of F3-D5 and a main chord pattern of F2-B2-F2.

Critical reception
Amanda Hensel of Taste of Country gave the song five stars out of five, saying that McBride "captures our hearts with this one, reminding us why she's one of the best in the business." Matt Bjorke of Roughstock also gave the song a positive review, writing that it has "all the hallmarks of her best and most powerful tunes."

Commercial performance
"I'm Gonna Love You Through It" debuted at number 50 on the U.S. Billboard Hot Country Songs chart for the week of August 6, 2011. In its sixth week on the Hot 100, the song ascended to number 61. In January 2012, the song became McBride's first Top Ten hit since "Anyway" in 2007, nearly five years earlier. Two months later, it peaked at number 4 on the country chart.  The song has sold 561,000 copies in the US as of October 2015, and has since been certified Gold by the R.I.A.A

Music video
The music video was directed by Roman White and premiered in August 2011. It features appearances from cancer survivors Sheryl Crow, Robin Roberts and Hoda Kotb and cancer activist Katie Couric.

Charts

Year-end charts

References

2011 singles
2011 songs
Martina McBride songs
Songs written by Ben Hayslip
Song recordings produced by Byron Gallimore
Music videos directed by Roman White
Songs written by Jimmy Yeary
Songs written by Sonya Isaacs
Republic Nashville singles
Songs about diseases and disorders
Songs about cancer